David S. Daniel is the CEO of Spencer Stuart and has been with the company since 1994. Previously, he served as president and CEO of Simint USA, a division of Armani Jeans. Prior to that, he was president of Louis Vuitton, North America, and CEO of Evian Waters of France (U.S.). Before his tenure at Evian, Daniel was a senior marketing manager with Pepsi-Cola and also worked in the retail and apparel business at Lord & Taylor.

He serves on the board of trustees of the Alvin Ailey American Dance Theater and the advisory board of the Yale School of Management.

Daniel holds a master's degree from Yale School of Management and a bachelor's degree from Wesleyan University.  He also attended Colegio de San Juan de Letran, a private Roman Catholic educational institution located in Intramuros, Manila, in the Philippines.

References
  
David S. Daniel bio at Spencer Stuart

Year of birth missing (living people)
Living people
Wesleyan University alumni
Yale School of Management alumni
American retail chief executives